Statue of Philip Sheridan may refer to:

 Equestrian statue of Philip Sheridan, Washington, D.C.
 Statue of Philip Sheridan (New York City)